Saiban may refer to:
 Jabal al-Tair Island, previously known as Saiban, volcanic island at the mouth of the Red Sea about half way between Yemen and Eritrea
 Saiban (Japanese historic figure)

See also 
 Saber (disambiguation)